Menelas Siafakas (born 1974) is an Athens-based Greek artist, filmmaker, photographer, and film festival director. Siafakas is an LGBT activist.

Life and work 
Siafakas has been a prolific activist and artist in the LGBTQI+ movement in Greece. Growing up in an almost invisible and politically ignored gay scene, he decided to leave Greece in the early 1990s and study sports science at the University of Glasgow. It gave him his first opportunity to live an open life. As a student councilor, Siafakas used his position to try to change society. He expanded the university's Pride celebrations from a one-day event to an entire week. He started workshops, debates, parties, and sporting events, including a sponsored run for an HIV charity.

Menelas returned to Greece in 2009.  In 2011, he founded the annual queer arts festival Civil Disobedience. He is also a member of the team that sought an ultimately successful conviction of Greek Orthodox Bishop Amvrosios for homophobic hate speech. He is the founder and co-organizer of the Queer Theatre Awards for Athens since 2012. He is also involved in the ongoing fight for justice following the brutal murder of Zak Kostopoulos, one of Greece's most prominent and courageous LGBTQI+ activists, in September 2018.

Filmmaking and film curating 

Since 2019, Siafakas has been a member of various film juries (e.g. Porn Film Festival Vienna), organizing screenings and public meetings in which he addresses themes of art forms and queer activism as well as the importance of film theater in the field of sexuality, social politics, and gender. He was also part of the exhibition "Eros" in 2019, which was shown at MOMus-Experimental Center for the Arts as part of the Thessaloniki Queer Arts Festival.

In 2019, the Greek Tourism Organization commissioned a commercial by Siafakas, but it was banned without any reason.

In 2020, Siafakas founded Satyrs and Maenads: the Athens Porn Film Festival, a festival dedicated to bringing together queer theory, art, and pornography. Siafaks also curated erotic film programs screened in various European cities (Vienna and San Francisco).

Filmography 
Siafakas's short films:
The Good Kid (2012)
The Naked Truth (2012)
Post-Orgasmic (2013)
The Raspberry Reich GR (2015)
Scattered Thoughts of a Young Sex Worker (2016)
Symposium: an athenian rawmance (2017)
Welcome to Athens (2018)
The Melita Show The Movie (2019)

Photography 
Siafakas is working as a photographer for various outlets like Kaltblut and Butt Magazine.

Awards 
 Best International Porn Short Film at the 2022 Porn Film Festival Vienna.

References

External links 

 
 Athens Voice about Siafakas' film "Welcome to Athens"
 Athens Voice about Siafakas and the launching of Athens Porn Film Festival
 The Radicals about Siafakas

1974 births
Greek film directors
Film people from Athens
Greek LGBT rights activists
HIV/AIDS activists
Living people